Hastijan Rural District is a rural district (dehestan) in the Central District of Delijan County, Markazi Province, Iran. At the 2006 census, its population was 2,518, in 882 families. The rural district has 13 villages.

References 

Rural Districts of Markazi Province
Delijan County